Spalagadames (Kharosthi:) was an Iranian king, who ruled Sakastan in the last quarter of the 1st-century BC after his father Spalahores, who was himself possibly a brother of king Vonones. Spalagadames has been suggested by the Iranologist Khodadad Rezakhani to be the same figure as the first Indo-Parthian king Gondophares.

Name
Spalagadames's name is attested on his coins in the Kharosthi form , which is derived from the Saka name , meaning "commander of army".

References

Sources 
 
  

1st-century BC Iranian monarchs